Ghost Hardware is the third EP release by English electronic musician Burial, released on the Hyperdub label in 2007.

Track listing

References

External links
 Ghost Hardware  at Hyperdub (official)

2007 EPs
Burial (musician) EPs
Hyperdub EPs
Trip hop EPs